Stoneface may refer to:

Geography
Stoneface, Natural Research Area in the Shawnee National Forest
Great Stone Face, rock formation in Millard County, Utah purported to look like the profile of Joseph Smith.

Books
Stoneface, novel in Deathlands series
The Great Stone Face (Hawthorne) 1850
Stoneface, character in The Roots of the Mountains novel by William Morris 1913
Stoneface (comics), a Marvel Comics character

People
Stoneface, rapper with Wu-Tang Clan
Old stone face, nickname of several people
The Great Stone Face (disambiguation), nickname of several people
Stoneface (sculptor), nickname of Andrew Vickers

See also